The 1968 Paris–Nice was the 26th edition of the Paris–Nice cycle race and was held from 7 March to 15 March 1968. The race started in Paris and finished in Nice. The race was won by Rolf Wolfshohl of the Bic team.

General classification

References

1968
1968 in road cycling
1968 in French sport
March 1968 sports events in Europe
1968 Super Prestige Pernod